Naomi S. Baron (born September 27, 1946, New York, NY) is a linguist and professor emerita of linguistics at the Department of World Languages and Cultures at American University in Washington, D.C.

Education and career 
Baron earned a B.A. in 1968 in English and American Literature at Brandeis University, and, in 1973, a PhD in linguistics at Stanford University. Her dissertation is titled, "The Evolution of English Periphrastic Causatives: Contributions to a general theory of linguistic variation and change." She taught at Brown University, the Rhode Island School of Design, Emory University, and Southwestern University before coming to American University, where she held a position from 1987 until her retirement.

Research interests 
Her areas of research and interest include computer-mediated communication, writing and technology, language in social context, language acquisition and the history of English. She is also interested in language use in the computer age, instant messaging, text messaging, mobile phone practices, cross-cultural research on mobile phones, Human multitasking behavior, and Facebook online social interaction usage by American college students. She has published a number of books on these topics.

Honors and awards 
She was a Guggenheim Fellow, Fulbright Fellow, and president of the Semiotic Society of America.

Her book, Always On: Language in an Online and Mobile World, which was published in 2008, won the English-Speaking Union’s HRH The Duke of Edinburgh ESU English Language Book Award for 2008.

Selected works

Books 
 Baron, Naomi S., Words onscreen. The fate of reading in a digital world, Oxford : Oxford University Press, 2015. 
 Baron, Naomi S., Always on : language in an online and mobile world, Oxford; New York : Oxford University Press, 2008. 
 Baron, Naomi S., Alphabet to E-mail: How Written English Evolved and Where It's Heading, London; New York : Routledge, 2000. 	
 Baron, Naomi S., Growing up with language : how children learn to talk, Reading, Mass. : Addison-Wesley Pub. Co., 1992. 
 Baron, Naomi S., Pigeon-birds and rhyming words : the role of parents in language learning, Englewood Cliffs, N.J. : Prentice Hall, 1990. 
 Baron, Naomi S., Computer languages : a guide for the perplexed, Garden City, N.Y.: Anchor Press/Doubleday, 1986. 
 Baron, Naomi S., Speech, writing, and sign : a functional view of linguistic representation, Bloomington : Indiana University Press, 1980. 
 Baron, Naomi S., Language acquisition and historical change, Amsterdam; New York : North Holland Pub. Co.; New York : distributors for the US and Canada, Elsevier North-Holland, 1977.

References

Further reading 
 Fahmy, Sameh, "E-mail and the mangling of the English language", USA Today, May 14, 2002, Gannett News Service
 "Being 'Always On' Impacts Personal Relationships More Than It Impacts The Written Language", Science Daily, May 24, 2008
 Maynard, Melissa, "Review: Always On: Language in an Online and Mobile World", Critical Inquiry in Language Studies, 2008.

External links 
  at American University

Living people
Linguists from the United States
American media critics
Analytic philosophers
Generative linguistics
Developmental psycholinguists
American University faculty and staff
American phonologists
Syntacticians
American semioticians
Brandeis University alumni
Stanford University alumni
Women linguists
American women non-fiction writers
1946 births
Fulbright alumni
American women academics